John Ruch (6 May 1834 – 21 August 1912) was a member of the Wisconsin State Assembly.

Biography
Ruch was born Massillon, Ohio. On October 24, 1858, he married Emma Buchanan. Ruch owned sawmills and a farm in Scott, Sheboygan County, Wisconsin.

Political career
Ruch was a member of the Assembly in 1880. Additionally, he was Chairman of the Town Board (similar to city council), Town Clerk and Superintendent of Schools of Scott and a Presidential Elector for the 1888 United States Presidential Election. He was a Republican.

References

1834 births
1912 deaths
People from Massillon, Ohio
People from Scott, Sheboygan County, Wisconsin
Republican Party members of the Wisconsin State Assembly
Wisconsin city council members
City and town clerks
School superintendents in Wisconsin
Farmers from Wisconsin
Educators from Ohio
1888 United States presidential electors